The Abejas de León (English: León Bees) is a Mexican professional basketball team. It has been a member of the LNBP since the 2009-10 season.

History

Foundation 
The team was previously known as the Piedras Negras Bravos but the Universidad de Guanajuato bought the team and relocated it to its home town in the city of Guanajuato with the help of the City Hall and several businessmen.

First seasons 
During their first season they struggled but managed to make it to the postseason in the second-worst seed. They lost against the Halcones UV Xalapa team who were the eventual champions. In their second season they entered the postseason for the second year in a row, again losing in the first round, this time being swept by the Pioneros de Quintana Roo. The following season they occupied the ninth seed, again classifying to the playoffs, but lost in the first round to the worst-qualified team, the Barreteros de Zacatecas.

Becoming better 
At their fourth season the team made it to the postseason in the 9th seed. This time they finally made it past the first-round to the quarter-finals. In the first round the team defeated the Huracanes de Tampico 3 games to 1. They lost in the quarter finals against the Halcones. This is the best playoff appearance in team history. During the 13-14 season they placed fourth in regular season marking the best regular season by the team but lost in the quarterfinals against Fuerza Regia de Monterrey.

Roster

Current roster

External links 
 Official website

Basketball teams in Mexico
León, Guanajuato
Sports teams in Guanajuato
Basketball teams established in 2009
2009 establishments in Mexico